was a Japanese Zen Buddhist monk and diplomat in the Muromachi period.   He was the chief envoy of a 1511–1513 mission sent by the Ashikaga shogunate to the court of the Zhengde Emperor in Beijing.

Tofuku-ji abbot
In 1486, the Rinzai monk Keigo was the 171st abbot of the Tofuku-ji monastery when the honorific title "Ryōan" was conferred by Emperor Go-Tsuchimikado.  He was already considered famous when he was designated by Ashikaga Yoshizumi to lead the 1511 mission to China; and Yoshizumi conferred the further honorific title "Butsunichi Zenji," perhaps with the intention of impressing the Chinese.

Mission to China
The economic benefit of the Sinocentric tribute system was profitable trade. The tally trade (kangō bōeki or kanhe maoyi in Chinese) involved exchanges of Japanese products for Chinese goods.  The Chinese "tally" was a certificate issued by the Ming.  The first 100 such tallies were conveyed to Japan in 1404.  Only those with this formal proof of Imperial permission represented by the document were officially allowed to travel and trade within the boundaries of China; and only those diplomatic missions presenting authentic tallies were received as legitimate ambassadors.

Selected works 

 Goroku
 Jinshin nyūmin ki

See also
 Japanese missions to Ming China

Notes

References
 Fogel, Joshua A. (2009). Articulating the Sinosphere: Sino-Japanese Relations in Space and Time. Cambridge: Harvard University Press. ; 
 Goodrich, Luther Carrington and Zhaoying Fang. (1976).  Dictionary of Ming biography, 1368-1644 (明代名人傳), Vol. I;  Dictionary of Ming biography, 1368-1644 (明代名人傳), Vol. II.  New York: Columbia University Press. ; 
  Titsingh, Isaac, ed. (1834). [Siyun-sai Rin-siyo/Hayashi Gahō, 1652], Nipon o daï itsi ran; ou,  Annales des empereurs du Japon.  Paris: Oriental Translation Fund of Great Britain and Ireland. 
 Yoda, Yoshiie. (1996). The Foundations of Japan's Modernization: a comparison with China's Path towards Modernization. Leiden: Brill. ;

External links
 Autograph: Landscape by Sesshū Tōyō with inscription by Ryōan Keigo

Japanese diplomats
1425 births
1514 deaths